François Philippe Sarchi originally Samuel Morpurgo, born in Gradisca d'Isonzo in Italy in 1764 and died in Paris in 1830, was a lawyer, linguist, philologist of Illyrian origin, specializing in Italian and Hebrew.

After a legal and linguistic training, he became a professor at the University of Vienna; he wrote various books on language, grammar and Italian poetry. He was a notary in Trieste, then linguist and translator in Paris and London.

He then devoted himself to the study of literature and Hebrew philology. His main work on the subject is a book on Hebrew poetry and a Hebrew grammar.

Works 
(Only original works by Sarchi are shown, not his translations)
1795:  Theoretisch-praktische italienische Sprachlehre, Vienna; reprint in 1805.
1795:  Grammatica italiana, Vienne, Schmidt, 1795 ; 3rd reprint 1805.
1797:  Ape poetica o il fior da fiore delle migliorie poesie italiane, Vienna.
1811:  Elementi di Geografia moderna per uso di giovinette in versi rimati, Udine.
1817: An almanac, sundries, in the Israélite français (2 volumes, Paris), in La Minerve littéraire and in various newspapers and magazines.
1823: Cours de thèmes italiens, Paris, Th. Barrois et Jombert, (reprit Paris, 1823).
1824:  An Essay on Hebrew Poetry ancient and modern, Londpn online ; several repr. ; last edition: Kessinger Publishing, LLC, 2009 .
1827: Grammaire hébraïque raisonnée et comparée, Paris, Dondey-Dupré; several editions, alternately under the same name or under the name Nouvelle grammaire hébraïque raisonnée et comparée, Paris, Dondey-Dupré, 1827 and 1828 Read online ; Paris, Pélicier et Chatet, 1828, 1830 ... 1844.

Bibliography and sources 
 .
 .
 ; contains five requests for investigation and four police reports Philippe Sarchi, from October 1825 to October 1827.
 .
 .
 .
 .
 .

See also 
 Modern Hebrew grammar
 Hebrew

External links 

1764 births
1830 deaths
People from Gradisca d'Isonzo
Medieval Hebraists
Linguists from Italy
Grammarians from Italy
Italian philologists
Italian Hebraists
University of Vienna alumni
Academic staff of the University of Vienna
Members of the Société Asiatique